Khana Sor  (also written Khanasor, meaning: red house) is a town located in the Sinjar District of the Ninawa Governorate in Iraq. The town is located north of the Sinjar Mount. It belongs to the disputed territories of Northern Iraq.

Khana Sor is populated by Yazidis.

References

Populated places in Nineveh Governorate
Yazidi populated places in Iraq